was the 109th monarch of Japan, according to the traditional order of succession. Her reign lasted from 1629 to 1643.

In the history of Japan, Meishō was the seventh of eight women to become empress regnant. The six who reigned before her were Suiko, Kōgyoku/Saimei, Jitō, Genmei, Genshō, and Kōken/Shōtoku. Her sole female successor was Go-Sakuramachi.

Genealogy
She was the second daughter of Emperor Go-Mizunoo. Her mother was Tokugawa Masako, daughter of the second Tokugawa shōgun, Tokugawa Hidetada and his wife Oeyo. Hidetada was the son of Tokugawa Ieyasu and his consort, Oai.

Meishō lived within the Inner Apartments of the Heian Palace, as opposed to the section reserved for the women of the Imperial Court.  She had no children of her own, and was succeeded by her younger paternal half-brother, Go-Kōmyō. Her name was derived by combining the names of two previous empresses, Empress Genmei (707–715) and her daughter Empress Genshō (715–724).

Events of Meishō's life
Okiko-naishinnō became empress following the abdication of her father.   The succession (senso) was considered to have been received by the new monarch; and shortly thereafter, Empress Meishō is said to have acceded (sokui). The events during her lifetime shed some light on her reign. The years of Meishō's reign correspond with the development and growth of the Tokugawa shogunate under the leadership of  Tokugawa Iemitsu.

 January 9, 1624: The birth of an Imperial princess who will become known by the posthumous name of Empress Meishō.
 1627 (Kan'ei 6): The : Emperor Go-Mizunoo was accused of having bestowed honorific purple garments to more than ten priests despite the shoguns edict which banned them for two years (probably in order to break the bond between the Emperor and religious circles). The shogunate intervened and invalidated the bestowal of the garments.
 December 22, 1629 (Kan'ei 6, 8th day of the 11th month): The emperor renounced the throne in favor of his daughter. The reign of the new empress was understood to have begun. She was aged 5; and she would grow to become the first woman to occupy the throne since Empress Shōtoku, the 48th sovereign who died in 770.
 1632 (Kan'ei 9, 24th day of the 1st month): Former shōgun Tokugawa Hidetada died.
 1633 (Kan'ei 10, 20th day of the 1st month): Earthquake in Odawara in Sagami Province.
 1634 (Kanei 11): Shogun Tokugawa Iemitsu visited Miyako; and it is believed that Meishō's father actually ruled in her name until she abdicated in favor of her younger half-brother.
 1635 (Kanei 12): An ambassador from King Injo of Korea is received in Miyako.
 1637 (Kanei 14): A major rebellion occurs in the Arima and Shimabara with many Christians involved; shogunal forces are sent to quell the disturbance.
 1638 (Kanei 15): The Arima and Shimabara revolt is crushed; and 37,000 of the rebels are killed. The Christian religion is banned in Japan under pain of death.
 1640 (Kanei 17): A Spanish ship from Macau brought a delegation of 61 people to Nagasaki. They arrived on July 6, 1640; and on August 9, all of them were decapitated and their heads were stuck on poles.
 1641 (Kanei 18): Meishō's half brother, Prince Tsuguhito, was named Crown Prince.
 1643 (Kanei 20): An ambassador from the King of Korea arrived in Japan.
 1643 (Kanei 20, 23rd day of the 4th month): Emperor Go-Kōmyō is said to have acceded to the throne (sokui).

Empress Meishō reigned for fifteen years. Although there were seven other reigning empresses, their successors were most often selected from amongst the males of the paternal Imperial bloodline, which is why some conservative scholars argue that the women's reigns were temporary and that male-only succession tradition must be maintained in the 21st century. Empress Gemmei, who was followed on the throne by her daughter, Empress Gensho, remains the sole exception to this conventional argument.

 December 4, 1696: The former empress died at age 72.

The kami of this empress is venerated in the imperial mausoleum at Tsuki no wa no misasagi, which is located at Sennyū-ji in Higashiyama-ku, Kyoto. Also enshrined is her father, Emperor Go-Mizunoo and her immediate Imperial successors – Go-Kōmyō, Go-Sai, Reigen, Higashiyama, Nakamikado, Sakuramachi, Momozono, Go-Sakuramachi and Go-Momozono.

Kugyō
 is a collective term for the very few most powerful men attached to the court of the Emperor of Japan in pre-Meiji eras. Even during those years in which the court's actual influence outside the palace walls was minimal, the hierarchic organization persisted.

In general, this elite group included only three to four men at a time. These were hereditary courtiers whose experience and background would have brought them to the pinnacle of a life's career. During Meishō's reign, this apex of the Daijō-kan included:
 Sesshō, Ichijō Akiyoshi, 1629–1635
 Sesshō, Nijō Yasumichi, 1635–1647
 Sadaijin
 Udaijin
 Naidaijin
 Dainagon

Era of Meishō's reign
The years of Meishō's reign are encompassed within one era name or nengō.
 Kan'ei (1624–1644)

Ancestry

References

Sources
 
 Meyer, Eva-Maria (1999).  Japans Kaiserhof in der Edo-Zeit: unter besonderer Berücksichtigung der Jahre 1846 bis 1867, Münster: LIT Verlag; /Japans Kaiserhof in der Edo-Zeit: unter besonderer Berücksichtigung der Jahre 1846 bis 1867; OCLC 42041594
 Ponsonby-Fane, Richard (1959). The Imperial House of Japan, Kyoto: Ponsonby Memorial Society; OCLC 194887The Imperial House of Japan; OCLC 194887
 Titsingh, Isaac (1834). Nihon Ōdai Ichiran  Annales des empereurs du Japon pp. 411–412, Paris: Royal Asiatic Society, Oriental Translation Fund of Great Britain and Ireland.
 Varley, H. Paul (1980). Jinnō Shōtōki: A Chronicle of Gods and Sovereigns, New York: Columbia University Press. /

Japanese monarchs
1624 births
1696 deaths
Empress Meisho
Empress Meisho
Empress Meisho
Empress Meisho
17th-century women rulers
17th-century Japanese monarchs
Japanese empresses regnant
Women rulers in Japan
Japanese Buddhist nuns
17th-century Buddhist nuns
Japanese Buddhist monarchs
Japanese retired emperors
Child monarchs from Asia
Japanese princesses